Oleg Kozlitine (born September 22, 1969) is a Kazakh former professional racing cyclist. He rode in the 1993 and 1996 Tour de France, but did not finish either.

Major results
1990
 2nd Volta a Lleida
1993
 1st Paris–Camembert
 9th Grand Prix de Wallonie
1998
 1st Grand Prix des Flandres Françaises
1999
 1st Stage 3 Tour de Bretagne Cycliste
 1st Stage 4 Tour du Loir-et-Cher
 4th Overall Tour de Normandie

References

1969 births
Living people
Kazakhstani male cyclists